The emutails are a pair of birds formerly assigned to the genus Dromaeocercus. They are both placed in the family Locustellidae.

 Brown emutail, Bradypterus brunneus
 Grey emutail, Bradypterus seebohmi

Locustellidae
Taxonomy articles created by Polbot